ISO 6943 is a specification created by the International Organization for Standardization for a method in determining the tension fatigue of vulcanised rubber.

References

06943
Rubber